There are various neighbourhoods within the city of Charlottetown, Prince Edward Island.

Brighton
Brighton is Charlottetown's most prestigious neighbourhood, buffered from the city somewhat by bucolic Victoria Park. Comprising houses over 100 years old as well as newer developments from the 1970s to the 1990s, Brighton is roughly delineated by Colonel Gray Drive, North River Road, and Brighton Road.  Houses with proximity to Charlottetown Harbour and the North (Yorke) River tend to be more prestigious with their large lots along a former cottage area.  Mature trees line newer developments along Queen Elizabeth Drive, Edinburgh Drive, Inkerman Drive, and Prince Charles Drive. Older Victorian homes are situated in Old Brighton which is a smaller neighbourhood east of North River Road, being bounded by McGill Avenue, North River Road, Ambrose Street, and Brighton Road.

Spring Park
The former village of Spring Park is situated in the central western part of the city.  Incorporated in 1956 and dissolved through amalgamation with Charlottetown in 1958, the neighbourhood is defined by Spring Park Road which ran from Charlottetown to what was then a rural village on the northern edge of the city.  It is roughly delineated by Queen Street, Pond Street, Colonel Gray Drive and the southern boundary with West Royalty along the north (Hermitage Creek).  

This was Charlottetown's first post-war suburb developed during the 1960s and was centred on Spring Park Elementary School, originally located on Kirkwood Drive (now used by the Charlottetown Police Department) and currently on Dunkirk Street. The neighbourhood consisted of smaller bungalows interspersed with some larger homes and mature trees lining quiet streets. This is likely the most accessible Charlottetown neighbourhood to services within walking distance with several popular churches, restaurants, schools and employment locations within and adjacent to the area.  The neighbourhood expanded significantly during the 1960s with the construction of Colonel Gray High School on Spring Park Road and residential developments such as Holland Park and Skyview that followed in the 1970s and Westwood and Marysfield in the 1980s and 1990s.

West Royalty
The former village of West Royalty is situated in the northwest portion of the city, bordered on the west by the North (Yorke) River, on the north by the former village of Winsloe (also part of Charlottetown), on the east by Route 2 and on the south by Hermitage Creek (the former city limits for Charlottetown and the northern boundary of its Spring Park neighbourhood).

Located on a peninsula in the North (Yorke) River created by Ellen's Creek, Lewis Point Park, and Orchard Hill are two neighbourhoods in West Royalty which were built in the 1970s and 1980s on former farm and wood land.  The geographic inaccessibility of the area, along with its shoreline and striking water views of Charlottetown Harbour and the North River, made for several exclusive streets.  Its major arteries are Maypoint Road and Beachgrove Road, which host the only multiple-unit apartment buildings in the neighbourhood.  It is home to primarily upper-middle-class families, Charlottetown Rural High School, Grace Baptist Christian School and West Royalty Elementary are the only schools within walking distance. The original West Royalty Elementary School was a one-room school located on the Lower Malpeque Road until the 1990s when it was replaced by the present modern structure relocated to the northern part of the neighbourhood to service several new subdivisions.  Despite being within walking distance, secondary school students do not attend Charlottetown Rural High School and must instead attend Colonel Gray High School several kilometres to the south.

West Royalty also hosts additional residential developments dating to the 1990s and 2000s (Highland View, Gates, Bell Heights, Richmond Hill, Park West, Upton Park and Sandlewood Park) as well as Charlottetown's largest suburban retail location, the Charlottetown Mall, centred on the road junction of Route 1 and Route 2.

The majority of new subdivisions have been built on speculation by developers and have yet to receive mature vegetation.

Sherwood
The former village of Sherwood is situated in the northeast portion of the city.  Largely developed in the 1960s and 1970s, the neighbourhood is largely middle class with some homes constructed in the 1980s and 1990s.  The neighbourhood is roughly delineated by Mount Edward Road, Sherwood Road, Brackley Point Road, Oak Drive, Riverside Drive, Kensington Road, Falconwood Drive and Belvedere Avenue.  The Charlottetown Airport, along with the Sherwood Industrial Park, is situated on its northern boundary and a retail centre is situated at the junction between Belvedere Avenue, St. Peters Road and Brackley Point Road.

The neighbourhood was amalgamated into Charlottetown in 1996 and has since been seeing a lot of development. There are many multi unit apartment buildings being built toward the boundary between Sherwood and East Royalty, as well as single-family homes and duplexes throughout the new developments. Schools within walking distance include Stone Park Intermediate School and Sherwood Elementary School.

Parkdale
The former town of Parkdale is located along the city's eastern boundary on the East (Hillsborough) River.  Parkdale developed during the 1940s and 1950s into a suburb of the city and was home to several industries served by the railway, as well as hosting the city's harness racing track and exhibition grounds.  The area is primarily middle class and has smaller homes.  The neighbourhood is bounded by Mount Edward Road, Belvedere Avenue, Falconwood Drive, Riverside Drive, Park Street and Belmont Street.  Parkdale Elementary School is the only school located within the former town, however Birchwood Junior High School is located several hundred metres from the former municipal boundary with Charlottetown.

East Royalty
The former village of East Royalty occupies the northeast portion of the city.  It lies east of the airport and northeast of Riverside Drive, fronting the East (Hillsborough) River.

The southern part of the neighbourhood is dominated by the Hillsborough Park subdivision, developed by the provincial government in the 1970s and 1980s to provide affordable housing, which contains a variety of apartment buildings, townhouses, duplexes, as well as smaller single-family homes.

The northern part of East Royalty is defined by St. Peters Road and Norwood Road, occupying small farming areas and several new subdivisions.  The Lucy Maude Montgomery Elementary School was constructed in the 1980s to serve new residential developments.

Downtown Charlottetown
Downtown Charlottetown is the original boundaries of the community as surveyed in 1764 and comprises all property south of Euston Street and west of the rail corridor (now the Confederation Trail). The original 500 residential lots from this survey have been kept largely intact, except for some office and retail development in the centre of the city, focused on Queen Street and University Avenue, as well as Grafton Street and Kent Street. The Confederation Court Mall occupies an entire city block, and the downtown is dominated by federal and provincial government offices, as well as service industry employers. The city's cultural centre, the Confederation Centre of the Arts is located here, as is the provincial legislature building Province House and the city hall. Parts of the waterfront have been redeveloped during the 1990s from former industrial uses by the railway and commercial shipping industries into parkland. The entire waterfront south of water street was infilled with agricultural soil taken from properties adjacent to the rail lines north of the city during the early 1900s, consequently these areas are prone to erosion and sea level rise.

References